Dumraon is a town, near Buxar city and nagar parishad corresponding community development block in Buxar district in the Indian state of Bihar. Dumraon is one of Bihar's oldest municipalities and one of India's oldest princely states also known as Dumraon Raj. It is known for its Sinhora. Sights include Jangali Shiv ka Mandir, Bihariji Ka Mandir, Dumrejani mai ka Mandir, Maa Dakshini bhavani ji ka Mandir and Kaliji Ka Mandir.

Geography

History
Dumraon was the capital of the Dumraon Raj, a powerful zamindari estate ruled by the Ujjainiya Rajputs. The rulers of Dumraon constituted the senior branch of the Ujjainiyas in the region, with the estates at Buxar and Jagdishpur being younger branches. Dumraon was made the capital of the estate in 1745 by Raja Horil Singh (r. 1709-1746), who built a fortress at Dumraon. (Horil Singh's nephews, Buddh Singh and Udwant Singh, founded the estates at Buxar and Jagdishpur.)

Dumraon was formally constituted as a municipality in 1877; during the late 1800s, the town was a producer and exporter of sugar.

Demographics
 India census, Dumraon had a population of 53,618 as per census of 2011 Out of which 28,498 are males while 25,120 are females. The Average Sex Ratio of Dumraon is 881. Males constitute 53% of the population. Dumraon has an average literacy rate of 71.6% lower than the national average by 2.64%: male literacy is 66.6% and, female literacy is 53.4% . In Dumraon, 16% of the population is under 6 years of age. Religion-wise population of Dumraon is as follows: there are 83.85% Hindu, 15.94 Muslim, 0.11% christian, 0.01% Buddhist and 0.07% non-religion.

Popular References

Ustad Bismillah Khan (21 March 1916 – 21 August 2006) (born as Qamaruddin Khan), often referred to by the honorific title Ustad, was an Indian musician credited with popularizing the shehnai, a subcontinental wind instrument of the oboe class. Khan was born on 21 March 1916 in a family of traditional Muslim musicians in Bhirung Raut Ki Gali, Dumraon, in what is now the eastern Indian state of Bihar, as the second son of Paigambar Baksh Khan and Mitthan. He was awarded India's highest civilian honour, the Bharat Ratna, in 2001, becoming the third classical musician after M. S. Subbulakshmi and Ravi Shankar to be accorded this distinction.

The Former Princely State also finds mention and is the setting for the second half of the popular novel Half Girlfriend by Chetan Bhagat where the protagonist Madhav Jha played by Arjun Kapoor is the  Prince of the former Princely state Dumraon.

Railways
Dumraon Railway Station is located in between Ara and Buxar Railway Station on the Howrah–Delhi main line via Patna–Mughalsarai section main line. The Railway code for Dumraon is DURE.

Villages 
Besides the city of Dumraon itself, there are 93 villages in Dumraon block. Of these, 73 are inhabited and 20 are uninhabited. As of 2011, the total population of these villages was 179,064, in 28,898 households.

References

Cities and towns in Buxar district